Invisibles is a 2018 French comedy-drama film directed by Louis-Julien Petit, based on the 2015 novel Sur la Route des Invisibles, Femmes Dans La Rue by Claire Lajeunie.

The film premiered at the 2018 Angoulême Film Festival and was released on 9 January 2019, to generally positive reviews.

Plot 
L'Envol, a day center for homeless women in Anzin, France, closes its doors: only 4% of the women who've been there have been reintegrated, which the city council considers to be insufficient. The civil workers decide to protest against these measures through civil disobedience and the secret installment of a therapeutic workshop and a sleeping hall in a squatter's home...

Cast 

 Audrey Lamy as Audrey Scapio
 Corinne Masiero as Manu
 Noémie Lvovsky as Hélène
 Déborah Lukumuena as Angélique
 Marianne Garcia as Marianne / 'Lady Di'
 Adolpha Van Meerhaeghe as Chantal
 Patricia Mouchon as Patricia / 'Edith Piaf'
 Khoukha Boukherbache as Khoukha / 'Marie-José Nat'
 Bérangère Toural as Bérangère / 'Simone Veil'
 Patricia Guery as Patricia / 'La Cicciolina'
 Marie-Christine Descheemaker as Marie-Christine / 'Brigitte Macron'
 Laetitia Grigy as Monique
 Fedoua Laafou	as Fedoua / 'Salma Hayek'
 Stéphanie Brayer as Stéphanie / 'Françoise Hardy'
 Marie-Thérèse Boloke Kanda as Marie-Thérèse / 'Mimie Mathy'
 Aïcha Bangoura as Aïcha / 'Vanessa Paradis'
 Dominique Manet as Dominique / 'Brigitte Fontaine'
 Assia Menmadala as Assia / 'Dalida'
 Sarah Suco as Julie Carpentier
 Pablo Pauly as Dimitri
 Brigitte Sy as Béatrice
 Quentin Faure as Laurent
 Marie-Christine Orry as Catherine Paraire
 Fatsah Bouyahmed as Esteban
 Antoine Reinartz as Deputy mayor

Release 
The film had its world premiere at the Angoulême Film Festival on 22 August 2018 and was released in theaters on 9 January 2019.

Reception

Box office 
Invisibles grossed $0 in North America and $19 million worldwide.

Critical response 
On French review aggregator AlloCiné, the film holds an average rating of 3.6 out of 5, based on 25 professional reviews.

References

External links 
 
 Casting complet et équipe technique at AlloCiné (in French)

2018 films
2018 comedy-drama films
2010s French-language films
French comedy-drama films
French feminist films
Unemployment in fiction
Films shot in France
Films set in France
Cultural depictions of Diana, Princess of Wales
Cultural depictions of Édith Piaf
Cultural depictions of Ilona Staller
Cultural depictions of Dalida
2010s French films